These Are Special Times is the seventeenth studio album by Canadian singer Celine Dion, and her first English-language Christmas album. It was first released in Europe on 30 October 1998, by Columbia Records. In the United States, it was released on 3 November 1998 through Epic Records. The album features cover versions of popular Christmas songs and original material, including "I'm Your Angel", a duet with R. Kelly. Dion worked with David Foster and Ric Wake, who produced most of the album. Other producers include Bryan Adams, R. Kelly and Humberto Gatica. These Are Special Times was released after two of Dion's most successful albums, Falling into You (1996) and Let's Talk About Love (1997).

Upon its release, These Are Special Times received generally positive reviews from music critics. Many praised Dion's commitment to the project, as well as the production of the songs. The album has sold 5.6 million copies in the United States, according to Nielsen SoundScan, and has been certified 6x Platinum by the Recording Industry Association of America (RIAA). In Canada, the album has sold one million copies and been certified Diamond by the Canadian Recording Industry Association (CRIA). These Are Special Times has sold over 12 million copies worldwide and is one of the best-selling Christmas albums of all time.

The album spawned two singles. "I'm Your Angel" was released as the lead single on 16 November 1998 and peaked at number one on the US Billboard Hot 100. "The Prayer", a duet with Andrea Bocelli, was released as the second single on 1 March 1999 and won the Golden Globe Award for Best Original Song at the 56th Golden Globe Awards. In addition, "I'm Your Angel" and "The Prayer" were nominated for the Grammy Award for Best Pop Collaboration with Vocals at the 41st and 42nd Annual Grammy Awards, respectively. In 2021, Billboard named These Are Special Times the 8th Greatest Holiday Album of All Time.

Background 
Celine Dion released two French-language Christmas albums in her early career: Céline Dion chante Noël (1981) and Chants et contes de Noël (1983). Later, in 1993, she recorded "The Christmas Song" which appears on David Foster's The Christmas Album. The next year, Dion was featured on Alvin and the Chipmunks' "Petit Papa Noël" which is on their album A Very Merry Chipmunk. In 1996, she recorded "Brahms' Lullaby" for the compilation For Our Children Too to benefit the Elizabeth Glaser Pediatric AIDS Foundation. "The Christmas Song" and "Brahms' Lullaby" were included on These Are Special Times in 1998.

Content 

Dion worked on These Are Special Times with her longtime partners David Foster and Ric Wake, who produced most of the songs. The album contains seven original compositions: "Don't Save It All for Christmas Day" (co-written by Celine Dion; covered by Avalon in 2000 and Clay Aiken in 2004), "Another Year Has Gone By" (written and produced by Bryan Adams), a solo version of "The Magic of Christmas Day" (recorded in 1999 as a duet with Rosie O'Donnell and included on a charity album, A Rosie Christmas), "The Prayer" (duet with Andrea Bocelli; each artist sang it solo on the 1998 soundtrack to Quest for Camelot), "Christmas Eve", "These Are the Special Times" (written by Diane Warren; covered by Christina Aguilera in 2000) and "I'm Your Angel" (duet with R. Kelly, written and produced by Kelly). Other tracks include inspired arrangements of standards like "O Holy Night", "Blue Christmas" (Diana Krall on acoustic piano), "Adeste Fideles", "Ave Maria" and new versions of the modern classics "Happy Xmas (War Is Over)" and "Feliz Navidad". On the latter track and "Les cloches du hameau", Dion is joined by her family. In October 2007, the album was re-released as a Collector's Edition that includes a DVD of Dion's CBS television special for These Are Special Times. In November 2022, the album was re-released as a 2 LP Limited Edition Opaque Gold that omittes duet with R.Kelly but includes "I Met An Angel (On Christmas Day)" as the last track.

Critical reception 

These Are Special Times garnered generally positive reviews from music critics. Paul Verna from Billboard gave it a very positive review, praising Dion's maturity and the album's production. He wrote, "sounding at complete ease and wielding a wildly creative wand, an ever-maturing Dion conjures up surprise on what should be regarded as her next "big" album". Verna noted that this "grade-A effort" is "no ordinary holiday project". He praised "grandiose versions of standards" ("O Holy Night", "Adeste Fideles"), "modern classics" ("Happy Xmas (War Is Over)", "Feliz Navidad") and "thoughtfully produced original compositions" ("Another Year Has Gone By", "Don't Save It All for Christmas Day"). According to him, other highlights include "The Prayer", a "gorgeous duet" with Andrea Bocelli, the "Phil Spector-esque" "Christmas Eve", and a "sparkling reading" of "Ave Maria".

Chuck Taylor from Billboard also praised "I'm Your Angel", a duet with R. Kelly. He wrote that "this wonderfully restrained ballad delights with the most graceful vocal performances either of these artists has ever offered to radio". Taylor commented, "what raises the roof is the tune's elegant, epic instrumental base, which includes sweeping strings, a soulful choir, and gentle but determined percussive drive". He continued, that "I'm Your Angel" "sells big at the bridge, where the instrumentation drops and Kelly and Dion harmonize in a gorgeous minor key – it truly makes the song". Chuck Taylor also reviewed "The Prayer", calling it "a breathtaking, ultra-lush song, and the tour de force combination of Dion and Bocelli [which] will send a half-dozen chills up your spine". Although he felt that the song is "an unorthodox track for the radio", Taylor called it "affecting", "heartwarming", "absolutely exquisite" and "one of Dion's most radiant performances ever".

Stephen Thomas Erlewine of AllMusic stated that "any fan of Dion, or of '90s adult contemporary pop in general, should find this [album] very enjoyable". Although according to him, "at times, the production is too slick" and "at other times Dion's vocals are a little mannered," overall, These Are Special Times "is very effective, because the songs are good and she's committed to the material". Erlewine wrote that These Are Special Times is "an especially successful holiday album since Dion wisely balances" popular carols ("Blue Christmas," "The Christmas Song," "Feliz Navidad") with new songs ("I'm Your Angel," "Don't Save It All for Christmas"), hymns ("Adeste Fideles," "Ave Maria"), and Christmas songs with a distinct religious theme ("The Prayer," "O Holy Night")".

Commercial performance 
By the end of 1998, These are Special Times sold 6 million copies worldwide, including 738,000 from Canada, becoming the best-selling holiday album of 1998 in the US & globally. To date, the album has sold 12 million copies worldwide and became the second best-selling holiday album by a female artist in history.

United States
These Are Special Times debuted at number four on the US Billboard 200, selling 126,000 copies. The next week, it became a greatest gainer, jumping to number three and selling 163,000 units. In its third week, despite selling 210,000 copies, These Are Special Times fell to number five. In the fourth week, thanks to Dion's CBS television special, the album rose to number three, with a 94% sales increase (409,000 copies) becoming a greatest gainer again. The next week, it moved to its peak position on the Billboard 200, number two, with sales of 366,000 units. These Are Special Times tied Amy Grant's 1992 Home for Christmas as the highest-charting holiday album ever by a female artist. It stayed at number two for the second week, selling 413,000 copies. In the seventh week, These Are Special Times reached its highest weekly sales of 462,000 copies, despite falling to number three. In the last week inside the top ten, the album fell to number five selling another 461,000 copies. On the Top Holiday Albums, it topped the chart for nine consecutive weeks.

These Are Special Times became the best-selling holiday album of 1998 in the US with a total of 2,684,000 copies sold. Dion's album also sold more copies in its first year of release than any other holiday album by a female artist. On 6 December 2005, the album was certified five-times Platinum by the RIAA for shipment of five million copies in the US. On 16 November 2008, it also became the first holiday album by a female artist to top the five million mark in Nielsen SoundScan history. These Are Special Times is also the highest selling Christmas album by an artist born outside the US. It is the fourth best-selling Christmas album of the entire Nielsen SoundScan era with US sales of 5.6 million copies as of November 2019.

Rest of the world
In Canada and in Quebec, These Are Special Times peaked at number one. The album shipped one million copies and was certified Diamond by the CRIA.
In Japan, the album reached number four and exceeded sales of more than 500,000 copies. 
These Are Special Times was also successful in Australasia and Europe, hitting the top ten in most countries and peaking at number one in Switzerland and Norway.

Promotion 
Dion promoted the album in the United States with a television special which aired on CBS on 25 November 1998. It included two musical guests: Andrea Bocelli on "The Prayer" and Rosie O'Donnell on "Do You Hear What I Hear?". Dion also performed album tracks ("O Holy Night", "These Are the Special Times"), her number-one hits ("The Power of Love", "Because You Loved Me", "My Heart Will Go On"), as well as favorites ("Let's Talk About Love", "The First Time Ever I Saw Your Face"). These Are Special Times was a television ratings champion, ranking number-one for the night and drawing an audience of more than sixteen million viewers. The show was nominated for two Emmy Awards. Celine Dion and Andrea Bocelli also performed "The Prayer" at the 41st Grammy Awards on 24 February 1999 and at the 71st Academy Awards on 21 March 1999.

Singles 

"I'm Your Angel" was released as the first single from the album. It became Dion's fourth number-one on the US Billboard Hot 100, topping the chart for six consecutive weeks. On 9 December 1998, it was certified Platinum by the RIAA for shipment of one million copies in the United States. The song was also successful in Europe, peaking at number three in the United Kingdom. In March 1999, "The Prayer" (duet with Andrea Bocelli) was sent to adult contemporary radio stations in the United States and peaked at number twenty-two on the Hot Adult Contemporary Tracks. In February 2008, Dion recorded a live version of this song in a duet with Josh Groban. Thanks to the digital sales, the track entered the Billboard Hot 100 at number seventy.

Accolades 

These Are Special Times received the 1999 Japan Gold Disc Award for International Pop Album of the Year. At the 56th Golden Globe Awards, "The Prayer" won the award for Best Original Song. "I'm Your Angel" and "The Prayer" were nominated for the Grammy Award for Best Pop Collaboration with Vocals at the 41st and 42nd Grammy Awards, respectively. "The Prayer" was also nominated for the Academy Award for Best Original Song at the 71st Academy Awards. In 2017, 24/7 Wall St. Named These Are Special Times as the 8th best Holiday Album of all time.

Impact and legacy 
In recording her own version of the song for her 2020 holiday album My Gift, Carrie Underwood said that she was inspired by Dion's version of "O Holy Night", calling it "so beautiful and big and classic". Christina Aguilera recorded a rendition of "These Are The Special Times", and Patti Labelle performed a rendition of "Don't Save It All For Christmas Day". Billboard listed Dion's rendition of "Feliz Navidad" as one of the best covers of the song. Esquire listed Happy Xmas (War Is Over) among The 65 Best Christmas Songs of All Time'. Parade also listed the song "These Are The Special Times" at #44, among the 150 Best Christmas Songs of all Time. MTV praised These Are Special Times calling it "one of the Greatest Christmas albums to ever exist".Billboard'' ranked her rendition of the classic hit "O Holy Night" at number 68 on their "100 Best Christmas Songs of All Time" list, calling it a "bombastically earnest performance". Its the only rendition of the song present on the list.

 Rankings 

 Track listing Notes'''
  signifies Italian translation
  signifies a co-producer
  signifies an additional producer
 "I Met an Angel (On Christmas Day)" was originally included on "That's the Way It Is" single in 1999.

Credits and personnel 

Adapted from AllMusic.

Bryan Adams – arranger, bass, composer, guitar, producer, string arrangements
Tawatha Agee –	background vocals
Steve Amerson – background vocals
Morgan Ames – background vocals
Randy Andos – trombone
Jane Barnett – background vocals
David Barratt – production coordination
Tony Black – programming
Juan Bohorquez – assistant engineer, mixing assistant
Dick Bolks – background vocals
Alfred Bosco – assistant engineer
Jeff Bova – programming
Robert Bowker – background vocals
Jimmy Bralower – drum programming
Troy Bright – background vocals
Martin Briley – background vocals
Chris Brooke – assistant engineer
Alexandra Brown – choir, chorus
Bridgette Bryant – choir, chorus
Sharon Bryant – background vocals
Bob Buckley – conductor, string arrangements
Amick Byram – background vocals
Bob Cadway – engineer
Richie Cannata – tenor saxophone
Johnnie Carl – arranger
Elin Carlson – background vocals
Patrick Carroll – drum programming, bass guitar, percussion
Carmen Carter – choir, chorus
Lafayette Carthon Jr. – conductor, keyboards, background vocals
Sue Ann Carwell – background vocals
John Chiodini – guitar, electric guitar
Maria Christensen – composer, background vocals
Dennis Collins  – background vocals
Crystal Cathedral Choir – choir 	
Barry Danielian – trumpet
Donna Davidson – background vocals
Nathan Dean – mixing assistant
Russ DeSalvo – guitar
John Doelp – executive producer
Chuck Domanico  – bass
Terence Dover – engineer
Felipe Elgueta – engineer, programming
Gary Falcone – choir, chorus
David Foster – arranger, composer, keyboards, piano, producer
Bob Franceschini – alto saxophone
Simon Franglen – synclavier
Roger Freeland – background vocals
Yvonne Gage – background vocals
Humberto Gatica – engineer, mixing
Ayuana George – background vocals
Stephen George – programming
Diva Gray – background vocals
Nikki Gregoroff – background vocals
Don Hachey – mixing assistant
Andy Haller – assistant engineer
Jeff Hamilton – drums
Brian Harding – assistant engineer, mixing assistant
Linda Harmon – background vocals
Bill Harris – alto saxophone
Don Harris – trumpet
Dan Hetzel – engineer
Loris Holland – conductor, keyboards, Hammond organ, vocal arrangement, background vocals
Jimmy Hoyson – assistant engineer
Ronn Huff – arranger
Nancey Jackson – background vocals
Bashiri Johnson – background vocals
Tony Kadleck – trumpet
Shane Keister – arranger, handbell arrangement, piano, synclavier
Khris Kellow – background vocals
R. Kelly – arranger, composer, performer, producer
Rick Kerr – engineer
Curtis King – background vocals
Darlene Koldenhoven – background vocals
Diana Krall – piano
John Kurlander – engineer
Rick Logan – background vocals
Susie Stevens Logan – background vocals
Lisa Lougheed – background vocals
Jeremy Lubbock – arranger, string arrangements
Vito Luprano – executive producer
Johnny Mandel – orchestral arrangements
Ethan Mates – mixing assistant
Rob Mathes – conductor, orchestral arrangements
Paulette McWilliams – background vocals
Ozzie Melendez – trombone
Chieli Minucci – guitar
Cindy Mizelle – background vocals
Robert Moe – background vocals
Jeffrey Morrow – background vocals
Rob Murphy – assistant engineer, mixing assistant
Jake Ninan – assistant engineer
Rafael Padilla – percussion
Bobbi Page – choir, chorus
Shawn Pelton – drums
Randy Phillips – choir, chorus
Louis Price – choir, chorus
Tom Rainer – synthesizer
Jeffrey Ramsey – choir, chorus
Anthony Ransick – background vocals
Dave Reitzas – engineer
Cathy Richardson – background vocals
John "J.R." Robinson – drums
Robin Robinson – background vocals
Stevie Robinson – background vocals
Olle Romo – programming
William Ross – arranger, orchestral arrangements
Kamil Rustam – (acoustic guitar
Johnny Rutledge – background vocals
Larry Salzman – guitar
John Scarpulla – baritone saxophone
Al Schmitt – engineer
David Shackney – engineer
Don Shelton – background vocals
Marc Shulman – guitar
Ira Siegel – guitar
Steve Skinner – arranger, drum programming, keyboard programming
Ramón Stagnaro – acoustic guitar
Randy Staub – engineer
Aya Takemura – mixing assistant
Chris Taylor – guitar
David Taylor – bass trombone
Vaneese Thomas – background vocals
Michael Thompson – electric guitar
Fonzi Thornton – background vocals
UB Tirado – mixing assistant
Terry Trotter – piano
Rob Trow – background vocals
Eric Troyer – background vocals
Carmen Twillie – choir, chorus, background vocals
Vancouver Orchestra – strings
Gary Van Pelt – engineer
Jeff Vereb – mixing assistant
Frank Vilardi – drums
Ric Wake – arranger, composer, producer
Joan Walton – background vocals
Spencer Washington – background vocals
John West – background vocals
Phil Western – engineer, keyboards, programming, string arrangements
Brenda White-King – background vocals
George Whitty – engineer, keyboard arrangements, synthesizer arrangements
Cheryl Wilson – background vocals
Elisabeth Withers – background vocals
Steven Wolf – drums
Thomas R. Yezzi – engineer
Peter Zizzo – arranger, bass programming, composer, drum programming, guitar, keyboard programming

Charts

Weekly charts

Year-end charts

Decade-end charts

All-time charts

Certifications and sales

Release history

See also 
 List of best-selling albums by women
 List of best-selling Christmas/holiday albums in the United States
 List of Billboard number-one holiday albums of the 2010s
 List of Canadian number-one albums of 1998
 List of diamond-certified albums in Canada

References

External links 
 

1998 Christmas albums
550 Music albums
Albums produced by David Foster
Albums produced by Humberto Gatica
Albums produced by R. Kelly
Albums produced by Ric Wake
Celine Dion albums
Christmas albums by Canadian artists
Pop Christmas albums